

UCI Road World Rankings

Source

World Championships

The World Road Championships is set to be held in Florence, Italy.

UCI World Cup

Source

Single day races (1.1 and 1.2)

Stage races (2.HC, 2.1 and 2.2)

Continental Championships

International Games

National Championships

UCI teams

References

See also

 2013 in men's road cycling

 

Women's road cycling by year